The Rounders is a 1965 American Western comedy film directed by Burt Kennedy and starring Glenn Ford and Henry Fonda. It is based on the 1960 novel of the same name by Max Evans.

Plot
Ben Jones and Marion "Howdy" Lewis are two easygoing, modern-day cowboys who make a meager living breaking wild horses. Their frequent employer is Jim Ed Love, a shrewd businessman who always gets the better of them. After they bring him a string of tamed horses and spend the winter rounding up stray cows, he talks them into taking a nondescript roan horse in lieu of some of their wages.

To his great and frequent discomfort, Ben finds that the horse is unrideable. Rather than turning the horse into soap or dog food, he decides to take it to a rodeo and bet other cowhands that they cannot ride it, thereby doubling his and Howdy's earnings. Along the way, the duo stop to help two dimwitted strippers, Mary and Sister, with their car, which has broken down. Not knowing much about cars, they give them a ride to the nearest garage, but end up getting to know them better (going skinny dipping with them) and taking them along to the rodeo.  Unfortunately the girls lose their clothes and have to dress in waitress aprons, leaving them exposed in the rear.  The guys use their hats to cover them up.

Everything goes as planned; nobody is able to stay on the horse. However, the horse suddenly collapses and although Ben and Howdy are willing to spend all the money that they have won on veterinary help, the vet tells them it is hopeless: the horse should be destroyed. Ben walks into the stable, cocks the pistol and closes his eyes. A shot is heard. Ben comes flying out, and the roan kicks the stable to pieces, They give Tanner $475, all they have (the vet charged them more than $100). Tanner demands $200 more. Love steps in with the rest of the money, tells the boys they can work it out at his ranch and drives. They consider the benefits of life on Love's ranch. Ben muses that the definition of a bronc rider is “a cowboy  with his brains kicked out.” They drive away, and a police car makes a U-turn to follow them.

Cast
 Glenn Ford as Ben Jones
 Henry Fonda as Howdy Lewis
 Sue Ane Langdon as Mary
 Hope Holiday as Sister
 Chill Wills as Jim Ed Love
 Edgar Buchanan as Vince Moore
 Kathleen Freeman as Agatha Moore
 Joan Freeman as Meg Moore
 Denver Pyle as Bull
 Barton MacLane as Tanner
 Doodles Weaver as Arlee
 Allegra Varron as Mrs. Norson
 Casey Tibbs as Rafe

Reception
The film was a sleeper hit.

In a contemporary review, the New York Times found the film to be a "...good, small Western—far from perfect but beautifully personified by two wise, winning veterans." Reviewing The Rounders for the Los Angeles Times, Margaret Harford wrote: "The plot is thin, the comedy rather forced and the casting is unbelievable but at least it's a pleasant change from all those psychological westerns and attempted satires on same."

See also
List of American films of 1965

See also
 Rounders (film), a similarly titled but unrelated film
The Rounders, a TV series based on the film with Ron Hayes taking over Ford's role, Patrick Wayne assuming Fonda's, and Chill Wills returning as Jim Ed Love.

References

External links
 
 
 
 

1965 films
1960s Western (genre) comedy films
American Western (genre) comedy films
Films adapted into television shows
Films based on American novels
Films directed by Burt Kennedy
Metro-Goldwyn-Mayer films
Neo-Western films
1965 comedy films
1960s English-language films
1960s American films